David Stephen Geoffrey Pollock, 3rd Viscount Hanworth (born 16 February 1946), is a British professor and a Labour elected hereditary peer.

Hanworth was educated at Wellington College and has taken a DPhil degree at the University of Sussex. He is currently Professor of Econometrics and Computational Statistics at the University of Leicester, where he lectures in Mathematical Statistics, Econometrics and Environmental Sciences.

Background
A great-grandson of Ernest Pollock, 1st Viscount Hanworth, a former Master of the Rolls, Hanworth succeeded to the viscountcy (and baronetcy) upon his father's death in 1996 and took his seat in the House of Lords until the House of Lords Act in 1999 removed his automatic right to sit in Parliament. He chose not to stand in the election by Labour hereditary peers to select two of their number to remain in Parliament after this Act came into force. Hanworth stood but was unsuccessful in the by-election caused by the death of Lord Milner in 2003. Willing to work in the Lords still, in 2011 he won the cross-house hereditary by-election to become one of fifteen 'deputy speakers', following the death of Lord Strabolgi, who was also Labour.  He was therefore appointed/elected on the all hereditary-peer eligibility basis following a death of one of the 90 places which remain based on heredity.

Personal life
In 1968, he married Elizabeth Liberty, daughter of the writer and journalist Lawrence Vambe MBE. They live in London. The title is expected to pass to a nephew as they have two daughters: 
Hon. Cecile Pollock (born 1971)
Hon. Charlotte Pollock (born 1973)

Arms

References

External links 

 Debrett's People of Today 
 University of Leicester staff page

1946 births
Living people
English people of Scottish descent
People educated at Wellington College, Berkshire
Alumni of the University of Sussex
English economists
Academics of the University of Leicester
Fellows of the Econometric Society
Labour Party (UK) hereditary peers
3

Computational statisticians
Hanworth
Hanworth